Graham Harvey (born 28 May 1944) is a British sports shooter. He competed in the men's 25 metre rapid fire pistol event at the 1984 Summer Olympics.

References

External links
 

1944 births
Living people
British male sport shooters
Olympic shooters of Great Britain
Shooters at the 1984 Summer Olympics
People from Danbury, Essex
20th-century British people